The 67th Cannes Film Festival was held from 14 to 25 May 2014. New Zealand film director Jane Campion was the head of the jury for the main competition section. The Palme d'Or was awarded to the Turkish film Winter Sleep directed by Nuri Bilge Ceylan.

The festival opened with the long delayed Grace of Monaco, directed by Olivier Dahan and starring Nicole Kidman as Grace Kelly, which played out of competition. The restored 4K version of Sergio Leone's 1964 western A Fistful of Dollars, served as the closing night film. Due to European Parliament elections which took place on 25 May 2014, the winner of the Palme d'Or was announced on 24 May, and the winning film in the Un Certain Regard section announced on 23 May. The festival poster featured Italian actor Marcello Mastroianni from Federico Fellini's 1963 film 8½, which was presented in the 1963 Cannes Film Festival's Official Selection, within the Out of Competition section.

The Official Selection of films for the 2014 festival, including the line-up for the Main Competition, was announced on 17 April 2014. French actor Lambert Wilson hosted the opening and closing ceremonies.

Juries

Main competition
The full jury for the Main Competition was announced on 28 April 2014:
Jane Campion, New Zealand film director, Jury President
Carole Bouquet, French actress
Sofia Coppola, American film director
Leila Hatami, Iranian actress
 Jeon Do-yeon, South Korean actress
Willem Dafoe, American actor
Gael García Bernal, Mexican actor and film director
Jia Zhangke, Chinese film director
Nicolas Winding Refn, Danish film director

Un Certain Regard
The full jury for the Un Certain Regard section was announced on 11 May 2014:	
Pablo Trapero, Argentine film director, Jury President
Peter Becker, American president of The Criterion Collection
Maria Bonnevie, Norwegian-Swedish actress
Géraldine Pailhas, French actress
Moussa Touré, Senegalese film director

Caméra d'or
Nicole Garcia, French actress and director, Jury President
Richard Anconina, French actor
Gilles Gaillard, French technician
Sophie Grassin, French journalist and film critic
Héléna Klotz, French film director
Lisa Nesselson, American journalist and film critic
Philippe Van Leeuw, Belgian film director

Cinéfondation and short films
Abbas Kiarostami, Iranian film director, Jury President 
Daniela Thomas, Brazilian film director
Noémie Lvovsky, French film director
Joachim Trier, Norwegian film director
Mahamat Saleh Haroun, Chadian film director

Independent juries

Nespresso Grand Prize (International Critics' Week)
Andrea Arnold, English film director, Jury President
Daniela Michele, Mexican film journalist and founding director of the Morelia International Film Festival
Fernando Ganzo, Spanish film journalist
Jordan Mintzer, American film critic
Jonathan Romney, English film critic

Sony CineAlta Discovery Award for Short Film (International Critics' Week)
Rebecca Zlotowski, French film director, Jury President
Tine Fischer, Danish founder and director of the Copenhagen International Documentary Festival
Abi Sakamoto, Japanese head of cinema at the French Institute of Japan
Benny Dreschel, German film producer
Pablo Giorgelli, Argentine film director

France 4 Visionary Award (International Critics' Week)
Rebecca Zlotowski, French film director, Jury President
Louise Riousse, French film critic
Sergio Huidobro, Mexican film critic
Andrei Rus, Romanian film critic
Guido Segal, Argentine film critic

Queer Palm section
Bruce LaBruce, Canadian writer and film director, Jury President
Anna Margarita Albelo, Cuban-American film director
João Ferreira, Portuguese artistic director and programmer of the Queer Lisboa International Queer Film Festival
Charlotte Lipinska, French journalist and actress
Ricky Mastro, Brazilian film festival programmer of Recifest

Official selection

In competition
The films announced to compete for the Palme d'Or were named at the Cannes press conference on 17 April 2014. The Palme d'Or winner has been highlighted.

Un Certain Regard
Party Girl, directed by Marie Amachoukeli, Claire Burger and Samuel Theis, was selected as the opening film in the Un Certain Regard section.  The Un Certain Regard Prize winner has been highlighted.

(CdO) indicates film eligible for the Caméra d'Or as directorial debut feature.

Out of competition
The following films were screened out of competition:

Special screenings
The following films were presented in the Special screenings section:

Cinéfondation
The Cinéfondation section focuses on films made by students at film schools. The following 16 entries (14 fiction films and 2 animation films) were selected, out of more than 1,631 submissions from 320 different schools. Half of the films selected have been directed by women. The winner of the Cinéfondation First Prize has been highlighted.

Short films
Out of 3,450 submissions, the following films were selected to compete for the Short Film Palme d'Or. Italian film A passo d'uomo by Giovanni Aloi was removed from the selection because Aloi broke the regulations for the selection. The Short film Palme d'Or winner has been highlighted.

Cannes Classics
The line-up for the Cannes Classics section was announced on 4 April 2014. Italian actress Sophia Loren was announced as the guest of honour.

Cinéma de la Plage
The Cinéma de la Plage is a part of the Official Selection of the festival. The outdoors screenings at the beach cinema of Cannes are open to the public.

Parallel sections

International Critics' Week
The line-up for the International Critics' Week (Semaine de la Critique) was announced on 21 April at the section's website. FLA, directed by Djinn Carrénard, and Hippocrate, directed by Thomas Lilti, were selected as the opening and closing films of the Semaine de la Critique section.

Feature films - The winner of the Grand Prix Nespresso has been highlighted. 

(CdO) indicates film eligible for the Caméra d'Or as directorial debut feature.

Shorts selection

Special Screenings

Directors' Fortnight
The line-up for the Directors' Fortnight was announced on 22 April. Girlhood, directed by Céline Sciamma, and Pride, directed by Matthew Warchus, were selected as the opening and closing films of the Directors' Fortnight section.

Feature films - The winner of the Art Cinema Award has been highlighted.

(CdO) indicates film eligible for the Caméra d'Or as directorial debut feature.

Special screenings

Shorts selection - The winner of the Illy Prize for Short Film has been highlighted.

Awards

Winter Sleep became the first Turkish film to win the Palme d'Or since Yol won in 1982.  Director Nuri Bilge Ceylan called the win "a great surprise for me" and dedicated the win to the youth of Turkey as the country undergoes political turmoil and to the victims of the Soma mine disaster.  Prior to the start of Cannes, Winter Sleep was considered the favorite to win the Palme d'Or, but when it was shown it met with mixed critical reaction. Some found it to be too long (at 3 hours 16 minutes, it was the longest film at the festival) and difficult to finish, while others called it a great revelation.  The jury, however, loved the film. Jury president Jane Campion said "If I had the guts to be as honest about his characters as this director is, I'd be very proud of myself."

Winter Sleep is the story of Mr. Aydin (played by Haluk Bilginer), a former actor who now runs mountaintop hotel, and his failing marriage.  Aydin sees himself as the region's kind ruler, intervening in the business of the towns people below the mountain. In reality, almost everyone, including his wife, dislikes Aydin. He has a pompous column in the local newspaper and is writing a book on history of the Turkish theatre.  When the slow season approaches the guests depart, the fighting between Aydin, his wife, his sister who lives with him, and the village people begins.  Conversations dominate the film as the inner workings of the characters are slowly revealed.

The runner-up Grand Prix award went to the rite-of-passage drama The Wonders. Julianne Moore won the best actress prize or her portrayal of a demented Hollywood diva in Maps to the Stars.  Timothy Spall took the best actor prize for his portrayal of a marine painter in Mr. Turner.  Bennett Miller was named as best director for his work on Foxcatcher.  The Jury Prize was split between the drama Mommy and the drama Goodbye to Language.

Official awards
In Competition
 Palme d'Or: Winter Sleep by Nuri Bilge Ceylan
 Grand Prix: The Wonders by Alice Rohrwacher
 Best Director: Bennett Miller for Foxcatcher
 Best Screenplay: Andrey Zvyagintsev and Oleg Negin for Leviathan
 Best Actress: Julianne Moore for Maps to the Stars
 Best Actor: Timothy Spall for Mr. Turner
 Jury Prize: Mommy by Xavier Dolan and Goodbye to Language by Jean-Luc Godard

Un Certain Regard
 Prix Un Certain Regard: White God by Kornél Mundruczó
 Un Certain Regard Jury Prize: Force Majeure by Ruben Östlund
 Un Certain Regard Special Prize: The Salt of the Earth by Wim Wenders and Juliano Ribeiro Salgado
 Un Certain Regard Ensemble Prize: The cast of Party Girl
 Un Certain Regard Award for Best Actor: David Gulpilil for Charlie's Country

Golden Camera
 Caméra d'Or: Party Girl by Marie Amachoukeli, Claire Burger and Samuel Theis

Cinéfondation
 1st Prize: Skunk by Annie Silverstein
 Second Prize: Oh Lucy! by Atsuko Hirayanagi
 Third Prize: Sourdough by Fulvio Risuleo and The Bigger Picture by Daisy Jacobs

Short Films
 Short Film Palme d'Or: Leidi by Simón Mesa Soto
 Special Mention: Aïssa by Clément Trehin-Lalanne & Yes We Love by Hallvar Witzø

Independent awards
FIPRESCI Prize
 Winter Sleep by Nuri Bilge Ceylan (In Competition)
 Jauja by Lisandro Alonso (Un Certain Regard)
 Love at First Fight by Thomas Cailley (Director's Fortnight)

Vulcan Award of the Technical Artist
 Vulcan Award: Dick Pope for Mr. Turner (cinematography)

Ecumenical Jury
 Prize of the Ecumenical Jury: Timbuktu by Abderrahmane Sissako
 Prize of the Ecumenical Jury: Special mention:
 The Salt of the Earth by Wim Wenders & Juliano Ribeiro Salgado
 Beautiful Youth by Jaime Rosales

Awards in the frame of International Critics' Week
 Nespresso Grand Prize: The Tribe by Myroslav Slaboshpytskiy
 France 4 Visionary Award: The Tribe by Myroslav Slaboshpytskiy
 SACD Award: Hope by Boris Lojkine
 Sony CineAlta Discovery Award for Short Film: Young Lions of Gypsy by Jonas Carpignano
 Canal+ Award: Crocodile by Gäelle Denis
 Gan Foundation Support for Distribution Award: The Tribe by Myroslav Slaboshpytskiy

Awards in the frame of Directors' Fortnight
 Art Cinema Award: Love at First Fight by Thomas Cailley
 SACD Prize: Love at First Fight by Thomas Cailley
 Europa Cinemas Label Award: Love at First Fight by Thomas Cailley
 Illy Prize for Short Film: Heartless by Nara Normande and Tião
 Special Mention: It Can Pass Through the Wall by Radu Jude

Queer Palm Jury
 Queer Palm Award: Pride by Matthew Warchus

Palm Dog Jury
 Palm Dog Award: the canine cast of White God

Association Prix François Chalais
 Prix François Chalais: Timbuktu by Abderrahmane Sissako
 Prix François Chalais - Special mention: The Salt of the Earth by Wim Wenders & Juliano Ribeiro Salgado

Cannes Soundtrack Award
 Howard Shore for Maps to the Stars

References

External links

Official website Retrospective 2014
67ème Festival de Cannes
Cannes Film Festival: Awards for 2014 at Internet Movie Database

2014
2014 film festivals
2014 festivals in Europe
2014 in French cinema